Shabas ash-Shuhada (from ) is a city in Kafr el-Sheikh Governorate of Egypt.

In Ptolemaic and Byzantine Egypt it was known as Kabasa or Gabasson and was a center of the Kabassite nome, which after the Arab conquest was transformed into a kurah.

References 

Populated places in Kafr El Sheikh Governorate